Kentucky Route 519 (KY 519) is a  state highway in Kentucky that runs from Kentucky Route 7 southeast of Pomp to U.S. Route 60 and Clearfield Road in southwestern Morehead via Paragon, Lick Fork, and Clearfield.

Major intersections

References

0519
Transportation in Morgan County, Kentucky
Transportation in Rowan County, Kentucky